Jeremy Robert Thornburg (born May 7, 1982 in San Diego, California) is an American football safety who played for the Green Bay Packers and San Francisco 49ers. He was signed as an undrafted free agent out of Northern Arizona University.

High school
Thornburg attended Cathedral City High School in Cathedral City, California, and won varsity letters in football, basketball, and track. In football, he won three first-team All-Conference honors, and was the League Defensive MVP as a senior.

College
Thornburg attended Northern Arizona University for five years. He received Special Teams M.V.P in 2000. Team Defensive M.V.P in 2003 and 2004. All Conference honors in 2003 and 2004. Thornburg also led the Lumberjacks in tackles in 2003 and 2004.

References

American football safeties
Green Bay Packers players
Northern Arizona Lumberjacks football players
People from Cathedral City, California
Players of American football from San Diego
1982 births
Living people
San Francisco 49ers players